Jalan Kampung Tengah (Johor state route J154) is a major road in Segamat, Johor, Malaysia.

List of junctions and towns

Roads in Johor